Garrett High School is a 9-12 grade public high school located in Garrett, Indiana.

References

External links
Official Website

Schools in DeKalb County, Indiana
Public high schools in Indiana
Educational institutions established in 1965
1965 establishments in Indiana